Frank Lyman Beebe (1914 – 15 November 2008) was a falconer, writer and wildlife illustrator from Canada.

He founded the North American Falconers Association with Harold Webster.

Published works 
 Frank L. Beebe. A Falconry Manual. Surrey, B.C.: Hancock House, 2017. 
 Frank L. Beebe. Compleat Falconer. Surrey, B.C.: Hancock House, 1992. 
 Frank L. Beebe. Frank Beebe the Artist. Surrey, B.C.: Hancock House, 1992.

References

External links
A picture of Frank Beebe (left) with Hal Webster
Official Site of the North American Falconer's Association
Tribute to Frank Beebe

1914 births
2008 deaths
Canadian nature writers
Falconry